Mark James Foran (born 30 October 1973) is an English former professional footballer.

Notable achievements include winning the 1991 FA Youth Cup with Millwall F.C.

Mark Foran was once referred to as a "giant" by the then Peterborough United manager Barry Fry. The 6'4" defender featured briefly during footage of the video "Great Balls of Fire" hosted by Vinnie Jones when Fry was heard to shout "We've got a giant, why don't you fucking use him!" at one of his players.

During an FA Cup tie, playing for then Division 3 Bristol Rovers against then Premiership Derby County he man marked Fabrizio Ravanelli, the former Italian international. Rovers won the tie 3–1 at Pride Park.

A five-game loan spell at Wycombe Wanderers in the mid-1990s saw Foran voted by supporters as the worst ever player to represent the club. He did however return to haunt those who had given him this unwanted tag when he scored a headed goal against them whilst playing for Peterborough United.

A compendium of injuries contributed to Foran's shortened career, suffering three broken legs including one while playing for Crewe reserves.

He drifted into semi-professional football in the early 2000s before retiring to pursue a career outside the game.

References

External links

1973 births
Living people
Sportspeople from Aldershot
Footballers from Hampshire
English footballers
Association football defenders
Millwall F.C. players
Sheffield United F.C. players
Rotherham United F.C. players
Wycombe Wanderers F.C. players
Peterborough United F.C. players
Lincoln City F.C. players
Oldham Athletic A.F.C. players
Crewe Alexandra F.C. players
Bristol Rovers F.C. players
Telford United F.C. players
Northwich Victoria F.C. players